As of January 2023, Iceland does not have a public railway system. However there have been three small railways in the past. The main reasons for the lack of railways are the small population, competition with automobile traffic, and the harsh environment.

A proposal for a railway in Iceland was first made in the early 1900s, involving a line between Reykjavík and Selfoss, but it didn't proceed. In the 2000s, there were new proposals for both a light railway system in the Capital Region and an airport rail link to Keflavík.

Reykjavík Harbour Railway

Track network 

Probably the most well-known Icelandic rail project, the Reykjavík Harbour Railway, of  narrow gauge, operated from 1913 until 1928 for the construction of the harbour breakwaters. The railway operated from a quarry outside the city, Öskjuhlíð, from which it ran a short distance to a junction, passing loop, and sidings. The junction was located just south of a large field which became (and remains) the Reykjavík city airport. From there, one line ran to the west, around the western edge of the city, before proceeding along the newly constructed western harbour pier to the island of Effersey. A headshunt there allowed trains to reverse along a further line, built out onto the outer harbour wall, and extended as that wall itself grew longer. From the first junction a second line ran east around farms to a locomotive depot just outside the city, and on to a further junction where a short branch line led into a secondary quarrying site (now in the heart of the capital's residential district). The main line continued to a further junction on the edge of the docks. From there, one line ran along the quayside (where one of the locomotives is today preserved on display), whilst the other ran out along the eastern harbour wall.

Rolling stock
The railway was operated by two steam locomotives built by the Jung engine company of Germany, both of which have been preserved. Built in the 1890s in Germany, they worked briefly in Denmark before being imported to Iceland in 1913 for the harbour railway project. Locomotive Pioner is now a static exhibit at the Icelandic Folk Museum at Arbær, Árbær Museum, whilst locomotive Minør, after many years of storage in a Nissen hut under piles of rubbish, is now an open-air static exhibit in Reykjavík. A scale model of part of the railway, showing one of the locomotives at work, is displayed in the Reykjavík Maritime Museum. Minør was the first to be withdrawn, whilst Pioner (which had received a replacement boiler in 1910 to extend its life) continued to operate until the railway closed in 1928.

The main vehicles on the railway were four-wheeled open wagons. A large number of them operated, and they were built with fully opening sides for loading and unloading. It is thought that none of the vehicles has survived.

Incidents
Iceland's first railway accident was on the Reykjavik Harbour Railway. Records at the Árbær Museum show that both locomotives were involved in accidents between the two world wars. Pioner was deliberately derailed by vandals, who placed a chain across the track and weighted down its two sides with rocks. They later claimed that they were testing the locomotive's performance, because it had already survived their previous experiments of placing coins and planks on the track. Minør was involved in a genuine accident when a section of track gave way beneath the engine. That was later found to have been caused by rotten wooden sleepers supporting that section of track.

Kárahnjúkar light railway
A diesel-operated light railway was built in the early years of the 21st century, in connection with the construction of the Kárahnjúkar hydro-electric power project. The railway consisted of three trains, travelling around the clock, transporting people, concrete and other items to keep the drilling machines running. The train sets consisted of white coloured locomotive and wagons, built by Schöma of Germany. The lifespan of the railway was limited to the construction period of the project, and it has now closed. Much of the equipment used was leased from Schoma Lokomotiven of Germany  and returned there.

Iceland's first train collision occurred in 2004.  A passenger train, transporting construction workers, ran into a cement train in a tunnel lying under Valþjófstaðarfjall mountain. Three people were injured.

Korpúlfsstaðir farm railway
Korpúlfsstaðir was one of the first industrial farms in Iceland. Built in 1930 by Icelandic industrialist Thor Jensen, it was located on the outskirts of Reykjavík, on the Þingvellir road. The farm was equipped with a  narrow-gauge railway network, allowing the transportation of goods and materials around the farm site. The rolling stock consisted chiefly of four-wheel skip wagons. There were no operational locomotives during either documented visit to the railway (in 1984 and 1993), and trains were shunted by hand, by the farm's staff. It is not known whether the railway was originally equipped with locomotives. Korpúlfsstaðir Farm has now closed and the site has been developed as a golf course and an elementary school, incorporating most of the original farm buildings. There is no surviving part of this railway network.

Mainline railways in the 1900s

First proposals 
The first official proposals for railways in Iceland were made in 1906. The route would have run from Reykjavík to Selfoss via Þingvallavatn. That route would allow extensions to Akranes/Borgarfjörður, Rangarvöllur. Surveys were made in the summer at the instigation of the Prime Minister, Hannes Hafstein. Over the next few years,  engineer Jón Þorláksson conducted more surveys in regard to snowfall, and developed cost estimates, including a comparison between the cost of oil- and coal-powered systems.

Proposals in the 1920s 
In 1921, Alþingi decided to look at the possibility of railways again. Subsequently, in 1922–1923, a Danish engineer made surveys of a route from Reykjavík to Selfoss via Þrengsli. It was the shortest and cheapest solution. The route was envisioned to carry both passenger and freight, which would have been cheaper than existing methods of transportation. In 1927, the city development plan of Reykjavík included a railway terminus with multiple platforms, just outside the Reykjavík city centre in Norðurmýri. Automobile traffic was rising and there was a need for better roads. Comparisons were made between a road and rail system in Iceland, and it was eventually determined that roads would take priority. In 1931, plans for railways in Iceland were abandoned.

Recently proposed railways
There have been intermittent proposals for a passenger railway from Reykjavík to Keflavík International Airport, firstly in the early 2000s. In 2003, the idea of an airport railway was dropped and a dual carriageway road (road 41) was built instead, opening in 2008.

More recently, a private group has been looking into the idea of an airport railway. In 2014, a feasibility study was undertaken by Ráðgjöf og verkefnastjórnun, which declared that a high speed airport railway would be feasible with the increasing numbers of tourists coming to Iceland, and passenger numbers at Keflavík International Airport. The project has begun looking for funding and has had talks with the local municipalities about the planning and alignment of the railway.

The railway would run double tracked from the airport, roughly parallel to the current road, and would then be situated in tunnels from Hafnafjörður, with a terminal at Reykjavík's main bus station BSÍ. The maximum operating speed would be 250 km/h, and the journey would take 15 minutes. In 2015, "Fluglestin Þróunarfélag ehf." was created, with the intention of acquiring funding for the project and planning. The proposed English name for the project is "Lava Express". Initially it was planned that construction would start in 2020.

In 2019, all municipalities the rail line would pass through, except Hafnarfjörður, had approved a cooperation agreement on zoning related to the project, with Morgunblaðið reporting that a meeting with the mayor of Hafnarfjörður has been scheduled. Once fully agreed to, construction work could begin as early as 2022.

Light rail
There have also been serious proposals for a light rail system for the Capital Region (Reykjavík, Kópavogur, Hafnafjörður). In the Samtök Sveitarfélaga á Höfuðborgarsvæðinu (Association of municipalities in the Capital Area) master plan for the capital area, Höfuðborgarsvæðið 2040, the transport section outlines a plan to create a light rail/BRT system in the Capital Area. The mayors of the respective municipalities have agreed to the masterplan and have shown interest in this proposal, which is currently in a planning stage. There has been pressure put on Alþingi and the municipalities to clarify how the project will be funded.

See also 
 Transport in Iceland

References

External links 
 Árbær Museum/Reykjavik City Museum